Venezuela, officially the Bolivarian Republic of Venezuela, is a country on the northern coast of South America, consisting of a continental landmass and many islands and islets in the Caribbean Sea. The capital and largest urban agglomeration is the city of Caracas.

The continental territory is bordered on the north by the Caribbean Sea and the Atlantic Ocean, on the west by Colombia, Brazil on the south, Trinidad and Tobago to the north-east and on the east by Guyana. The Venezuelan government maintains a claim against Guyana to Guayana Esequiba. Venezuela is a federal presidential republic consisting of 23 states, the Capital District and federal dependencies covering Venezuela's offshore islands. Venezuela is among the most urbanized countries in Latin America; the vast majority of Venezuelans live in the cities of the north and in the capital.

The territory of Venezuela was colonized by Spain in 1522 amid resistance from indigenous peoples. In 1811, it became one of the first Spanish-American territories to declare independence from the Spanish and to form part, as a department, of the first federal Republic of Colombia (historiographically known as Gran Colombia). It separated as a full sovereign country in 1830. During the 19th century, Venezuela suffered political turmoil and autocracy, remaining dominated by regional military dictators until the mid-20th century. Since 1958, the country has had a series of democratic governments, as an exception where most of the region was ruled by military dictatorships, and the period was characterized by economic prosperity. Economic shocks in the 1980s and 1990s led to major political crises and widespread social unrest, including the deadly Caracazo riots of 1989, two attempted coups in 1992, and the impeachment of a President for embezzlement of public funds charges in 1993. The collapse in confidence in the existing parties saw the 1998 Venezuelan presidential election, the catalyst for the Bolivarian Revolution, which began with a 1999 Constituent Assembly, where a new Constitution of Venezuela was imposed. The government's populist social welfare policies were bolstered by soaring oil prices, temporarily increasing social spending, and reducing economic inequality and poverty in the early years of the regime. However, poverty began to increase in the 2010s. The 2013 Venezuelan presidential election was widely disputed leading to widespread protest, which triggered another nationwide crisis that continues to this day.  Venezuela has experienced democratic backsliding, shifting into an authoritarian state. It ranks low in international measurements of freedom of the press and civil liberties and has high levels of perceived corruption.

Venezuela is a developing country and ranks 113th on the Human Development Index. It has the world's largest known oil reserves and has been one of the world's leading exporters of oil. Previously, the country was an underdeveloped exporter of agricultural commodities such as coffee and cocoa, but oil quickly came to dominate exports and government revenues. The excesses and poor policies of the incumbent government led to the collapse of Venezuela's entire economy. The country struggles with record hyperinflation, shortages of basic goods, unemployment, poverty, disease, high child mortality, malnutrition, severe crime and corruption. These factors have precipitated the Venezuelan migrant crisis where more than three million people have fled the country. By 2017, Venezuela was declared to be in default regarding debt payments by credit rating agencies. The crisis in Venezuela has contributed to a rapidly deteriorating human rights situation, including increased abuses such as torture, arbitrary imprisonment, extrajudicial killings and attacks on human rights advocates. Venezuela is a charter member of the UN, Organization of American States (OAS), Union of South American Nations (UNASUR), ALBA, Mercosur, Latin American Integration Association (LAIA) and Organization of Ibero-American States (OEI).

Etymology

According to the most popular and accepted version, in 1499, an expedition led by Alonso de Ojeda visited the Venezuelan coast. The stilt houses in the area of Lake Maracaibo reminded the Italian navigator, Amerigo Vespucci, of the city of Venice, Italy, so he named the region Veneziola, or "Little Venice". The Spanish version of Veneziola is Venezuela.

Martín Fernández de Enciso, a member of the Vespucci and Ojeda crew, gave a different account. In his work Summa de geografía, he states that the crew found indigenous people who called themselves the Veneciuela. Thus, the name "Venezuela" may have evolved from the native word.

Previously, the official name was Estado de Venezuela (1830–1856), República de Venezuela (1856–1864), Estados Unidos de Venezuela (1864–1953), and again República de Venezuela (1953–1999).

History

Pre-Columbian history

Evidence exists of human habitation in the area now known as Venezuela from about 15,000 years ago. Leaf-shaped tools from this period, together with chopping and plano-convex scraping implements, have been found exposed on the high riverine terraces of the Rio Pedregal in western Venezuela. Late Pleistocene hunting artifacts, including spear tips, have been found at a similar series of sites in northwestern Venezuela known as "El Jobo"; according to radiocarbon dating, these date from 13,000 to 7,000 BC.

It is not known how many people lived in Venezuela before the Spanish conquest; it has been estimated at around one million. In addition to indigenous peoples known today, the population included historical groups such as the Kalina (Caribs), Auaké, Caquetio, Mariche, and Timoto–Cuicas. The Timoto–Cuica culture was the most complex society in Pre-Columbian Venezuela, with pre-planned permanent villages, surrounded by irrigated, terraced fields. They also stored water in tanks. Their houses were made primarily of stone and wood with thatched roofs. They were peaceful, for the most part, and depended on growing crops. Regional crops included potatoes and ullucos. They left behind works of art, particularly anthropomorphic ceramics, but no major monuments. They spun vegetable fibers to weave into textiles and mats for housing. They are credited with having invented the arepa, a staple in Venezuelan cuisine.

After the conquest, the population dropped markedly, mainly through the spread of new infectious diseases from Europe. Two main north–south axes of pre-Columbian population were present, who cultivated maize in the west and manioc in the east. Large parts of the llanos were cultivated through a combination of slash and burn and permanent settled agriculture.

Colonization 

In 1498, during his third voyage to the Americas, Christopher Columbus sailed near the Orinoco Delta and landed in the Gulf of Paria. Amazed by the great offshore current of freshwater which deflected his course eastward, Columbus expressed in a letter to Isabella and Ferdinand that he must have reached Heaven on Earth (terrestrial paradise):

Spain's colonization of mainland Venezuela started in 1522, establishing its first permanent South American settlement in the  city of Cumaná.

German colonization 
In the 16th century, the king of Spain granted a concession in Venezuela to the Welser family of German bankers and merchants. Klein-Venedig  became the most extensive initiative in the German colonization of the Americas from 1528 to 1546. The Welser family of Augsburg and Nuremberg were bankers to the Habsburgs and financiers of Charles V, Holy Roman Emperor, who was also King of Spain and had borrowed heavily from them to pay bribes for his Imperial election.

In 1528, Charles V granted the Welsers the right to explore, rule and colonize the territory, as well as to seek the mythical golden town of El Dorado. The first expedition was led by Ambrosius Ehinger, who established Maracaibo in 1529. After the deaths of first Ehinger (1533), then Nikolaus Federmann, and Georg von Speyer (1540), Philipp von Hutten persisted in exploring of the interior. In absence of von Hutten from the capital of the province, the crown of Spain claimed the right to appoint a governor. On Hutten's return to the capital, Santa Ana de Coro, in 1546, the Spanish governor Juan de Carvajal had Hutten and Bartholomeus VI. Welser executed. Subsequently, Charles V revoked Welser's concession. The Welsers transported German miners to the colony, in addition to 4,000 African slaves to plant sugar cane plantations. Many of the German colonists died from tropical diseases, to which they had no immunity, or through frequent wars with the indigenous inhabitants.

Late 15th century to early 17th century 
Native caciques (leaders) such as Guaicaipuro and Tamanaco (died 1573) attempted to resist Spanish incursions, but the newcomers ultimately subdued them; Tamanaco was put to death by order of Caracas' founder, Diego de Losada.

In the 16th century, during the Spanish colonization, indigenous peoples such as many of the Mariches, themselves descendants of the Kalina, were converted to Roman Catholicism. Some of the resisting tribes or leaders are commemorated in place names, including Caracas, Chacao and Los Teques. The early colonial settlements focused on the northern coast, but in the mid-18th century, the Spanish pushed farther inland along the Orinoco River. Here, the Ye'kuana (then known as the Makiritare) organized serious resistance in 1775 and 1776.

Spain's eastern Venezuelan settlements were incorporated into New Andalusia Province. Administered by the Royal Audiencia of Santo Domingo from the early 16th century, most of Venezuela became part of the Viceroyalty of New Granada in the early 18th century, and was then reorganized as an autonomous Captaincy General starting in 1777. The town of Caracas, founded in the central coastal region in 1567, was well-placed to become a key location, being near the coastal port of La Guaira whilst itself being located in a valley in a mountain range, providing defensive strength against pirates and a more fertile and healthy climate.

Independence and 19th century 

After a series of unsuccessful uprisings, Venezuela, under the leadership of Francisco de Miranda, a Venezuelan marshal who had fought in the American Revolution and the French Revolution, declared independence as the First Republic of Venezuela on 5 July 1811. This began the Venezuelan War of Independence. A devastating earthquake that struck Caracas in 1812, together with the rebellion of the Venezuelan llaneros, helped bring down the republic. Simón Bolívar, new leader of the independentist forces, launched his Admirable Campaign in 1813 from New Granada, retaking most of the territory and being proclaimed as El Libertador ("The Liberator"). A second Venezuelan republic was proclaimed on 7 August 1813, but lasted only a few months before being crushed at the hands of royalist caudillo José Tomás Boves and his personal army of llaneros.

The end of the French invasion of homeland Spain in 1814 allowed the preparation of a large expeditionary force to the American provinces under general Pablo Morillo, with the goal to regain the lost territory in Venezuela and New Granada. As the war reached a stalemate on 1817, Bolívar reestablished the Third Republic of Venezuela on the territory still controlled by the patriots, mainly in the Guayana and Llanos regions. This republic was short-lived as only two years later, during the Congress of Angostura of 1819, the union of Venezuela with New Granada was decreed to form the Republic of Colombia (historiographically Republic of Gran Colombia). The war continued for some years, until full victory and sovereignty was attained after Bolívar, aided by José Antonio Páez and Antonio José de Sucre, won the Battle of Carabobo on 24 June 1821. On 24 July 1823, José Prudencio Padilla and Rafael Urdaneta helped seal Venezuelan independence with their victory in the Battle of Lake Maracaibo. New Granada's congress gave Bolívar control of the Granadian army; leading it, he liberated several countries and founded the Republic of Colombia (Gran Colombia).

Sucre, who won many battles for Bolívar, went on to liberate Ecuador and later become the second president of Bolivia. Venezuela remained part of Gran Colombia until 1830, when a rebellion led by Páez allowed the proclamation of a newly independent Venezuela, on 22 September; Páez became the first president of the new State of Venezuela. Between one-quarter and one-third of Venezuela's population was lost during these two decades of warfare (including perhaps one-half of the Venezuelans of European descent), which by 1830, was estimated at 800,000.

The colors of the Venezuelan flag are yellow, blue, and red: the yellow stands for land wealth, the blue for the sea that separates Venezuela from Spain, and the red for the blood shed by the heroes of independence.

Slavery in Venezuela was abolished in 1854. Much of Venezuela's 19th-century history was characterized by political turmoil and dictatorial rule, including the Independence leader José Antonio Páez, who gained the presidency three times and served a total of 11 years between 1830 and 1863. This culminated in the Federal War (1859–1863), a civil war in which hundreds of thousands died in a country with a population of not much more than a million people. In the latter half of the century, Antonio Guzmán Blanco, another caudillo, served a total of 13 years between 1870 and 1887, with three other presidents interspersed.

In 1895, a longstanding dispute with Great Britain about the territory of Guayana Esequiba, which Britain claimed as part of British Guiana and Venezuela saw as Venezuelan territory, erupted into the Venezuela Crisis of 1895. The dispute became a diplomatic crisis when Venezuela's lobbyist, William L. Scruggs, sought to argue that British behavior over the issue violated the United States' Monroe Doctrine of 1823, and used his influence in Washington, D.C., to pursue the matter. Then, U.S. president Grover Cleveland adopted a broad interpretation of the doctrine that did not just simply forbid new European colonies, but declared an American interest in any matter within the hemisphere. Britain ultimately accepted arbitration, but in negotiations over its terms was able to persuade the U.S. on many of the details. A tribunal convened in Paris in 1898 to decide the issue and in 1899 awarded the bulk of the disputed territory to British Guiana.

In 1899, Cipriano Castro, assisted by his friend Juan Vicente Gómez, seized power in Caracas, marching an army from his base in the Andean state of Táchira. Castro defaulted on Venezuela's considerable foreign debts and declined to pay compensation to foreigners caught up in Venezuela's civil wars. This led to the Venezuela Crisis of 1902–1903, in which Britain, Germany and Italy imposed a naval blockade of several months before international arbitration at the new Permanent Court of Arbitration in The Hague was agreed. In 1908, another dispute broke out with the Netherlands, which was resolved when Castro left for medical treatment in Germany and was promptly overthrown by Juan Vicente Gómez (1908–1935).

20th century 

The discovery of massive oil deposits in Lake Maracaibo during World War I proved to be pivotal for Venezuela and transformed the basis of its economy from a heavy dependence on agricultural exports. It prompted an economic boom that lasted into the 1980s; by 1935, Venezuela's per capita gross domestic product was Latin America's highest. Gómez benefited handsomely from this, as corruption thrived, but at the same time, the new source of income helped him centralize the Venezuelan state and develop its authority.

He remained the most powerful man in Venezuela until his death in 1935, although at times he ceded the presidency to others. The gomecista dictatorship (1935–1945) system largely continued under Eleazar López Contreras, but from 1941, under Isaías Medina Angarita, was relaxed.  Angarita granted a range of reforms, including the legalization of all political parties. After World War II, immigration from Southern Europe (mainly from Spain, Italy, Portugal, and France) and poorer Latin American countries markedly diversified Venezuelan society.

In 1945, a civilian-military coup overthrew Medina Angarita and ushered in a three-year period of democratic rule (1945–1948) under the mass membership party Democratic Action, initially under Rómulo Betancourt, until Rómulo Gallegos won the 1947 Venezuelan presidential election (generally believed to be the first free and fair elections in Venezuela). Gallegos governed until overthrown by a military junta led by the triumvirate , Marcos Pérez Jiménez, and Gallegos' Defense Minister, Carlos Delgado Chalbaud, in the 1948 Venezuelan coup d'état.

The most powerful man in the military junta (1948–1958) was Pérez Jiménez (though Chalbaud was its titular president) and was suspected of being behind the death in office of Chalbaud, who died in a bungled kidnapping in 1950. When the junta unexpectedly lost the election it held in 1952, it ignored the results and Pérez Jiménez was installed as president, where he remained until 1958.

The military dictator Pérez Jiménez was forced out on 23 January 1958. In an effort to consolidate a young democracy, the three major political parties (Acción Democrática (AD), COPEI and Unión Republicana Democrática (URD), with the notable exception of the Communist Party of Venezuela), signed the Puntofijo Pact power-sharing agreement. The two first parties would dominate the political landscape for four decades.

During the presidencies of Rómulo Betancourt (1959–1964, his second term) and Raúl Leoni (1964–1969) in the 1960s, substantial guerilla movements occurred, including the Armed Forces of National Liberation and the Revolutionary Left Movement, which had split from AD in 1960. Most of these movements laid down their arms under Rafael Caldera's first presidency (1969–1974); Caldera had won the 1968 election for COPEI, being the first time a party other than Democratic Action took the presidency through a democratic election. The new democratic order had its antagonists. Betancourt suffered an attack planned by the Dominican dictator Rafael Trujillo in 1960, and the leftists excluded from the Pact initiated an armed insurgency by organizing themselves in the Armed Forces of National Liberation, sponsored by the Communist Party and Fidel Castro. In 1962 they tried to destabilize the military corps, with failed revolts in Carúpano and Puerto Cabello. At the same time, Betancourt promoted a foreign policy, the Betancourt Doctrine, in which he only recognized elected governments by popular vote.

The election in 1973 of Carlos Andrés Pérez coincided with an oil crisis, in which Venezuela's income exploded as oil prices soared; oil industries were nationalized in 1976. This led to massive increases in public spending, but also increases in external debts, which continued into the 1980s when the collapse of oil prices during the 1980s crippled the Venezuelan economy. As the government started to devalue the currency in February 1983 to face its financial obligations, Venezuelans' real standards of living fell dramatically. A number of failed economic policies and increasing corruption in government led to rising poverty and crime, worsening social indicators, and increased political instability.

In the 1980s, the Presidential Commission for State Reform (COPRE) emerged as a mechanism of political innovation. Venezuela was preparing for the decentralization of its political system and the diversification of its economy, reducing the large size of the State. The COPRE operated as an innovation mechanism, also by incorporating issues into the political agenda that were generally excluded from public deliberation by the main actors of the Venezuelan democratic system. The most discussed topics were incorporated into the public agenda: decentralization, political participation, municipalization, judicial order reforms and the role of the State in a new economic strategy. The social reality of the country made the changes difficult to apply.

Economic crises in the 1980s and 1990s led to a political crisis. Hundreds of people were killed by Venezuelan security forces and the military in the Caracazo riots of 1989 during the presidency of Carlos Andrés Pérez (1989–1993, his second term) and after the implementation of economic austerity measures. Hugo Chávez, who in 1982 had promised to depose the bipartisanship governments, used the growing anger at economic austerity measures to justify a coup d'état attempt in February 1992; a second coup d'état attempt occurred in November. President Carlos Andrés Pérez (re-elected in 1988) was impeached under embezzlement charges in 1993, leading to the interim presidency of Ramón José Velásquez (1993–1994). Coup leader Chávez was pardoned in March 1994 by president Rafael Caldera (1994–1999, his second term), with a clean slate and his political rights reinstated, allowing Chávez to win and maintain the presidency continuously from 1999 until his death in 2013. Chávez won the elections of 1998, 2000, 2006 and 2012 and the presidential referendum of 2004. The only gaps in his presidency occurred during the two-day de facto government of Pedro Carmona Estanga in 2002 and when Diosdado Cabello Rondón acted as interim president for a few hours.

Bolivarian government: 1999–present 

The Bolivarian Revolution refers to a left-wing populism social movement and political process in Venezuela led by Venezuelan president Hugo Chávez, who founded the Fifth Republic Movement in 1997 and the United Socialist Party of Venezuela in 2007. The "Bolivarian Revolution" is named after Simón Bolívar, an early 19th-century Venezuelan and Latin American revolutionary leader, prominent in the Spanish American wars of independence in achieving the independence of most of northern South America from Spanish rule. According to Chávez and other supporters, the "Bolivarian Revolution" seeks to build a mass movement to implement Bolivarianism—popular democracy, economic independence, equitable distribution of revenues, and an end to political corruption—in Venezuela. They interpret Bolívar's ideas from a populist perspective, using socialist rhetoric.

Hugo Chávez: 1999–2013 

A collapse in confidence in the existing parties led to Chávez being elected president in 1998 and the subsequent launch of a "Bolivarian Revolution", beginning with a 1999 constituent assembly to write a new Constitution of Venezuela. Chávez also initiated Bolivarian missions, programs aimed at helping the poor.

In April 2002, Chávez was briefly ousted from power in the 2002 Venezuelan coup d'état attempt following popular demonstrations by his opponents, but Chavez returned to power after two days as a result of demonstrations by poor Chávez supporters in Caracas and actions by the military.

Chávez also remained in power after an all-out national strike that lasted from December 2002 to February 2003, including a strike/lockout in the state oil company PDVSA. Capital flight before and during the strike led to the reimposition of currency controls (which had been abolished in 1989), managed by the CADIVI agency. In the subsequent decade, the government was forced into several currency devaluations. These devaluations have done little to improve the situation of the Venezuelan people who rely on imported products or locally produced products that depend on imported inputs while dollar-denominated oil sales account for the vast majority of Venezuela's exports. According to Sebastian Boyd writing at Bloomberg News, the profits of the oil industry have been lost to "social engineering" and corruption, instead of investments needed to maintain oil production.

Chávez survived several further political tests, including an August 2004 recall referendum. He was elected for another term in December 2006 and re-elected for a third term in October 2012. However, he was never sworn in for his third period, due to medical complications. Chávez died on 5 March 2013 after a nearly two-year fight with cancer. The presidential election that took place on Sunday, 14 April 2013, was the first since Chávez took office in 1999 in which his name did not appear on the ballot.

Nicolás Maduro

2013–2018 

Poverty and inflation began to increase into the 2010s. Nicolás Maduro was elected in 2013 after the death of Chavez. Chavez picked Maduro as his successor and appointed him vice president in 2013. Maduro was elected president in a shortened election in 2013 following Chavez's death.

Nicolás Maduro has been the president of Venezuela since 14 April 2013, when he won the second presidential election after Chávez's death, with 50.61% of the votes against the opposition's candidate Henrique Capriles Radonski, who had 49.12% of the votes. The Democratic Unity Roundtable contested his election as fraud and as a violation of the constitution. An audit of 56% of the vote showed no discrepancies, and the Supreme Court of Venezuela ruled that under Venezuela's Constitution, Nicolás Maduro was the legitimate president and was invested as such by the Venezuelan National Assembly (Asamblea Nacional). Opposition leaders and some international media consider the government of Maduro to be a dictatorship. Since February 2014, hundreds of thousands of Venezuelans have protested over high levels of criminal violence, corruption, hyperinflation, and chronic scarcity of basic goods due to policies of the federal government. Demonstrations and riots have resulted in over 40 fatalities in the unrest between Chavistas and opposition protesters and opposition leaders, including Leopoldo López and Antonio Ledezma were arrested. Human rights groups condemned the arrest of Leopoldo López. In the 2015 Venezuelan parliamentary election, the opposition gained a majority.

Venezuela devalued its currency in February 2013 due to rising shortages in the country, which included those of milk, flour, and other necessities. This led to an increase in malnutrition, especially among children. Venezuela's economy had become strongly dependent on the exportation of oil, with crude accounting for 86% of exports, and a high price per barrel to support social programs. Beginning in 2014 the price of oil plummeted from over $100/bbl to $40/bbl a year and a half later. This placed pressure on the Venezuelan economy, which was no longer able to afford vast social programs. To counter the decrease in oil prices, the Venezuelan Government began taking more money from PDVSA, the state oil company, to meet budgets, resulting in a lack of reinvestment in fields and employees. In 2014, Venezuela entered an economic recession. In 2015, Venezuela had the world's highest inflation rate with the rate surpassing 100%, which was the highest in the country's history. In 2017, Donald Trump's administration imposed more economic sanctions against Venezuela's state-owned oil company PDVSA and Venezuelan officials. Economic problems, as well as crime and corruption, were some of the main causes of the 2014–present Venezuelan protests. Since 2014, roughly 5.6 million people have fled Venezuela.

In January 2016, President Maduro decreed an "economic emergency", revealing the extent of the crisis and expanding his powers. In July 2016, Colombian border crossings were temporarily opened to allow Venezuelans to purchase food and basic household and health items in Colombia. In September 2016, a study published in the Spanish-language Diario Las Américas indicated that 15% of Venezuelans are eating "food waste discarded by commercial establishments".

Close to 200 riots had occurred in Venezuelan prisons by October 2016, according to Una Ventana a la Libertad, an advocacy group for better prison conditions. The father of an inmate at Táchira Detention Center in Caracas alleged that his son was cannibalized by other inmates during a month-long riot, a claim corroborated by an anonymous police source but denied by the Minister of Correctional Affairs.

In 2017, Venezuela experienced a constitutional crisis in the country. In March 2017, opposition leaders branded President Maduro a dictator after the Maduro-aligned Supreme Tribunal, which had been overturning most National Assembly decisions since the opposition took control of the body, took over the functions of the assembly, pushing a lengthy political standoff to new heights. The Supreme Court backed down and reversed its decision on 1 April 2017. A month later, President Maduro announced the 2017 Venezuelan Constituent Assembly election and on 30 August 2017, the 2017 Constituent National Assembly was elected into office and quickly stripped the National Assembly of its powers.

In December 2017, President Maduro declared that leading opposition parties would be barred from taking part in the following year's presidential vote after they boycotted mayoral polls.

Since 2018 
Maduro won the 2018 election with 67.8% of the vote. The result was challenged by countries including Argentina, Chile, Colombia, Brazil, Canada, Germany, France and the United States who deemed it fraudulent and moved to recognize Juan Guaidó as president. Other countries including Cuba, China, Russia, Turkey, and Iran continued to recognize Maduro as president, although China, facing financial pressure over its position, reportedly began hedging its position by decreasing loans given, cancelling joint ventures, and signaling willingness to work with all parties. A Chinese Ministry of Foreign Affairs spokeswoman denied the reports, describing them as "false information".

In January 2019 the Permanent Council of the Organization of American States (OAS) approved a resolution "to not recognize the legitimacy of Nicolas Maduro's new term as of the 10th of January of 2019".

In August 2019, United States President Donald Trump signed an executive order to impose a total economic embargo against Venezuela. In March 2020, the Trump administration indicted Maduro and several Venezuelan officials, including the Chief Justice of the Supreme Tribunal, on charges of drug trafficking, narcoterrorism, and corruption.

In June 2020, a report by the US organisation Robert F. Kennedy Human Rights documented enforced disappearances in Venezuela that occurred in the years 2018 and 2019. During the period, 724 enforced disappearances of political detainees were reported. The report stated that Venezuelan security forces subjected victims, who had been disappeared, to illegal interrogation processes accompanied by torture and cruel or inhuman treatment. The report stated that the Venezuelan government strategically used enforced disappearances to silence political opponents and other critical voices it deemed a threat.

Geography 

Venezuela is located in the north of South America; geologically, its mainland rests on the South American Plate. The territory it controls lies between latitudes 0° and 16°N and longitudes 59° and 74°W.

Shaped roughly like a triangle, the country has a  coastline in the north, which includes numerous islands in the Caribbean and the northeast borders the northern Atlantic Ocean. Most observers describe Venezuela in terms of four fairly well defined topographical regions: the Maracaibo lowlands in the northwest, the northern mountains extending in a broad east–west arc from the Colombian border along the northern Caribbean coast, the wide plains in central Venezuela, and the Guiana Highlands in the southeast.

The northern mountains are the extreme northeastern extensions of South America's Andes mountain range. To the south, the dissected Guiana Highlands contain the northern fringes of the Amazon Basin and Angel Falls, the world's highest waterfall, as well as tepuis, large table-like mountains. The country's center is characterized by the llanos, which are extensive plains that stretch from the Colombian border in the far west to the Orinoco River delta in the east. The Orinoco, with its rich alluvial soils, binds the largest and most important river system of the country; it originates in one of the largest watersheds in Latin America. The Caroní and the Apure are other major rivers.

Venezuela borders Colombia to the west, Guyana to the east, and Brazil to the south. Caribbean islands such as Trinidad and Tobago, Grenada, Curaçao, Aruba, and the Leeward Antilles lie near the Venezuelan coast. Venezuela has territorial disputes with Guyana, formerly United Kingdom, largely concerning the Essequibo area and with Colombia concerning the Gulf of Venezuela. In 1895, after years of diplomatic attempts to solve the border dispute, the dispute over the Essequibo River border flared up. It was submitted to a "neutral" commission (composed of British, American, and Russian representatives and without a direct Venezuelan representative), which in 1899 decided mostly against Venezuela's claim.

Climate 
The precipitation level is lower in the period from August through April. These periods are referred to as hot-humid and cold-dry seasons. Another characteristic of the climate is this variation throughout the country by the existence of a mountain range called "Cordillera de la Costa" which crosses the country from east to west. The majority of the population lives in these mountains.

The country falls into four horizontal temperature zones based primarily on elevation, having tropical, dry, temperate with dry winters, and polar (alpine tundra) climates, amongst others.

Biodiversity and conservation 

Venezuela lies within the Neotropical realm; large portions of the country were originally covered by moist broadleaf forests. One of 17 megadiverse countries, Venezuela's habitats range from the Andes Mountains in the west to the Amazon Basin rainforest in the south, via extensive llanos plains and Caribbean coast in the center and the Orinoco River Delta in the east. They include xeric scrublands in the extreme northwest and coastal mangrove forests in the northeast. Its cloud forests and lowland rainforests are particularly rich.

Venezuela hosts a total of 1,417 bird species, 48 of which are endemic. Important birds include ibises, ospreys, kingfishers, and the yellow-orange Venezuelan troupial, the national bird. Notable mammals include the giant anteater, jaguar, and the capybara, the world's largest rodent. More than half of Venezuelan avian and mammalian species are found in the Amazonian forests south of the Orinoco.

For the fungi, an account was provided by R.W.G. Dennis which has been digitized and the records made available on-line as part of the Cybertruffle Robigalia database. That database includes nearly 3,900 species of fungi recorded from Venezuela, but is far from complete, and the true total number of fungal species already known from Venezuela is likely higher, given the generally accepted estimate that only about 7% of all fungi worldwide have so far been discovered.

Among plants of Venezuela, over 25,000 species of orchids are found in the country's cloud forest and lowland rainforest ecosystems. These include the flor de mayo orchid (Cattleya mossiae), the national flower. Venezuela's national tree is the araguaney, whose characteristic lushness after the rainy season led novelist Rómulo Gallegos to name it "[l]a primavera de oro de los araguaneyes" (the golden spring of the araguaneyes). The tops of the tepuis are also home to several carnivorous plants including the marsh pitcher plant, Heliamphora, and the insectivorous bromeliad, Brocchinia reducta.

Venezuela is among the top 20 countries in terms of endemism. Among its animals, 23% of reptilian and 50% of amphibian species, including the Trinidad poison frog, are endemic. Although the available information is still very small, a first effort has been made to estimate the number of fungal species endemic to Venezuela: 1334 species of fungi have been tentatively identified as possible endemics of the country. Some 38% of the over 21,000 plant species known from Venezuela are unique to the country.

Venezuela is one of the 10 most biodiverse countries on the planet, yet it is one of the leaders of deforestation due to economic and political factors. Each year, roughly 287,600 hectares of forest are permanently destroyed and other areas are degraded by mining, oil extraction, and logging. Between 1990 and 2005, Venezuela officially lost 8.3% of its forest cover, which is about 4.3 million ha. In response, federal protections for critical habitat were implemented; for example, 20% to 33% of forested land is protected. Venezuela had a 2019 Forest Landscape Integrity Index mean score of 8.78/10, ranking it 19th globally out of 172 countries. The country's biosphere reserve is part of the World Network of Biosphere Reserves; five wetlands are registered under the Ramsar Convention. In 2003, 70% of the nation's land was under conservation management in over 200 protected areas, including 43 national parks. Venezuela's 43 national parks include Canaima National Park, Morrocoy National Park, and Mochima National Park. In the far south is a reserve for the country's Yanomami tribes. Covering , the area is off-limits to farmers, miners, and all non-Yanomami settlers.

Venezuela was one of the few countries that did not enter an INDC at COP21. Many terrestrial ecosystems are considered endangered, specially the dry forest in the northern regions of the country and the coral reefs in the Caribbean coast.

There are some 105 protected areas in Venezuela, which cover around 26% of the country's continental, marine and insular surface.

Hydrography 

The country is made up of three river basins: the Caribbean Sea, the Atlantic Ocean and Lake Valencia, which forms an endorheic basin.

On the Atlantic side it drains most of Venezuela's river waters. The largest basin in this area is the extensive Orinoco basin whose surface area, close to one million km2, is greater than that of the whole of Venezuela, although it has a presence of 65% in the country.

The size of this basin - similar to that of the Danube - makes it the third largest in South America, and it gives rise to a flow of some 33,000 m³/s, making the Orinoco the third largest in the world, and also one of the most valuable from the point of view of renewable natural resources. The Rio or Brazo Casiquiare is unique in the world, as it is a natural derivation of the Orinoco that, after some 500 km in length, connects it to the Negro River, which in turn is a tributary of the Amazon. 

The Orinoco receives directly or indirectly rivers such as the Ventuari, the Caura, the Caroní, the Meta, the Arauca, the Apure and many others. Other Venezuelan rivers that empty into the Atlantic are the waters of the San Juan and Cuyuní basins. Finally, there is the Amazon River, which receives the Guainía, the Negro and others. Other basins are the Gulf of Paria and the Esequibo River.
The second most important watershed is the Caribbean Sea. The rivers of this region are usually short and of scarce and irregular flow, with some exceptions such as the Catatumbo, which originates in Colombia and drains into the Maracaibo Lake basin. Among the rivers that reach the Maracaibo lake basin are the Chama, the Escalante, the Catatumbo, and the contributions of the smaller basins of the Tocuyo, Yaracuy, Neverí and Manzanares rivers.

A minimum drains to the Lake Valencia basin. Of the total extension of the rivers, a total of 5400 km are navigable. Other rivers worth mentioning are the Apure, Arauca, Caura, Meta, Barima, Portuguesa, Ventuari and Zulia, among others.The country's main lakes are Lake Maracaibo -the largest in South America- open to the sea through the natural channel, but with fresh water, and Lake Valencia with its endorheic system. Other noteworthy bodies of water are the Guri reservoir, the Altagracia lagoon, the Camatagua reservoir and the Mucubají lagoon in the Andes. Navigation in Lake Maracaibo through the natural channel is useful for the mobilization of oil resources.

Relief 
The Venezuelan natural landscape is the product of the interaction of tectonic plates that since the Paleozoic have contributed to its current appearance. On the formed structures, seven physical-natural units have been modeled, differentiated in their relief and in their natural resources.

The relief of Venezuela has the following characteristics: coastline with several peninsulas and islands, adenas of the Andes mountain range (north and northwest), Lake Maracaibo (between the chains, on the coast); Orinoco river delta, region of peneplains and plateaus (tepui, east of the Orinoco) that together form the Guyanas massif (plateaus, southeast of the country).

The oldest rock formations in South America are found in the complex basement of the Guyanas highlands and in the crystalline line of the Maritime and Cordillera massifs in Venezuela. The Venezuelan part of the Guyanas Altiplano consists of a large granite block of gneiss and other crystalline Archean rocks, with underlying layers of sandstone and shale clay.

The core of granite and cordillera is, to a large extent, flanked by sedimentary layers from the Cretaceous, folded in an anticline structure. Between these orographic systems there are plains covered with tertiary and quaternary layers of gravel, sands and clayey marls. The depression contains lagoons and lakes, among which is that of Maracaibo, and presents, on the surface, alluvial deposits from the Quaternary, on layers of the Cretaceous and Tertiary particularly important; because of them oil infiltrations emerge.
The coasts
They present a landscape with intermountain depressions (separated by mountains), mountainous areas, a massif and an island group.
Lara-Falcón-Yaracuy System

The reliefs of mountain ranges contrast with those of the peninsula, coastal plains and intermountain depressions.
Lake Maracaibo Basin
The basin of the lake and the plains of the Gulf of Venezuela make up two plains: the northern one, drier, and the southern one, humid and with swamps.
The Andes
The corpulent volumes of mountain ranges and mountain ranges predominate, as well as intramontane valleys (located within the mountains).
The plains
They form extensive sedimentary basins, with a predominantly flat relief, except the eastern Llanos, which show plateaus, and the Unare depression, formed by the erosion of the mesa.
Guiana Shield
It exhibits a varied relief, shaped by different rocks, orogenic events and erosion over millions of years. That is why here there are peneplains, mountain ranges, foothills and the characteristic tepuis.
Orinoco Delta
With few contrasts, it builds a complex system of lands and waters, with varied sedimentary contributions and innumerable channels and islands.

Valleys 
The valleys are undoubtedly the most important type of landscape in the Venezuelan territory, not because of their spatial extension, but because they are the environment where most of the country's population and economic activities are concentrated. On the other hand, there are valleys throughout almost all the national space, except in the great sedimentary basins of the Llanos and the depression of the Maracaibo Lake, except also in the Amazonian peneplains.
By their modeling, the valleys of the Venezuelan territory belong mainly to two types: valleys of fluvial type and valleys of glacial type. Much more frequent, the former largely dominate the latter, which are restricted to the highest parts of the Andes. Moreover, most glacial valleys are relics of a past geologic epoch, which culminated some 10,000 to 12,000 years ago. They are frequently retouched today by fluvial events. Consequently, any attempt to categorize the Venezuelan valleys, based exclusively on the characteristics of their modeling, would be quite elementary.

The deep and narrow Andean valleys are very different from the wide depressions of Aragua and Carabobo, in the Cordillera de la Costa, or from the valleys nestled in the Mesas de Monagas. These examples indicate that the configuration of the local relief is decisive in identifying regional types of valleys. Likewise, due to their warm climate, the Guayana valleys are distinguished from the temperate or cold Andean valleys by their humid environment. Both are, in turn, different from the semi-arid depressions of the states of Lara and Falcón.

The Andean valleys, essentially agricultural, precociously populated but nowadays in loss of speed, do not confront the same problems of space occupation as the strongly urbanized and industrialized valleys of the central section of the Cordillera de la Costa. On the other hand, the unpopulated and practically untouched Guiana valleys are another category this area is called the Lost World (Mundo Perdido).

The Andean valleys are undoubtedly the most impressive of the Venezuelan territory because of the energy of the encasing reliefs, whose summits often dominate the valley bottoms by 3,000 to 3,500 meters of relative altitude. They are also the most picturesque in terms of their style of habitat, forms of land use, handicraft production and all the traditions linked to these activities. these activities

Deserts 

Venezuela has a great diversity of landscapes and climates, including arid and dry areas. The main desert in the country is in the state of Falcon near the city of Coro. It is now a protected park, the Médanos de Coro National Park. The park is the largest of its kind in Venezuela, covering 91 square kilometres. The landscape is dotted with cacti and other xerophytic plants that can survive in humidity-free conditions near the desert.

Desert wildlife includes mostly lizards, iguanas and other reptiles. Although less frequent, the desert is home to some foxes, giant anteaters and rabbits. There are also some native bird populations, such as the sparrowhawk, tropical mockingbird, scaly dove and crested quail.

Other desert areas in the country include part of the Guajira Desert in the Guajira Municipality in the north of Zulia State and facing the Gulf of Venezuela, the Médanos de Capanaparo in the Santos Luzardo National Park in Apure State, the Medanos de la Isla de Zapara in Zulia State, the so-called Hundición de Yay in the Andrés Eloy Blanco Municipality of Lara State, and the Urumaco Formation also in Falcón State.

Government and politics 

Following the fall of Marcos Pérez Jiménez in 1958, Venezuelan politics were dominated by the Third Way Christian democratic COPEI and the center-left social democratic Democratic Action (AD) parties; this two-party system was formalized by the puntofijismo arrangement. Economic crises in the 1980s and 1990s led to a political crisis which resulted in hundreds dead in the Caracazo riots of 1989, two attempted coups in 1992, and impeachment of President Carlos Andrés Pérez for corruption in 1993. A collapse in confidence in the existing parties saw the 1998 election of Hugo Chávez, who had led the first of the 1992 coup attempts, and the launch of a "Bolivarian Revolution", beginning with a 1999 Constituent Assembly to write a new Constitution of Venezuela.

The opposition's attempts to unseat Chávez included the 2002 Venezuelan coup d'état attempt, the Venezuelan general strike of 2002–2003, and the Venezuelan recall referendum, 2004, all of which failed. Chávez was re-elected in December 2006 but suffered a significant defeat in 2007 with the narrow rejection of the 2007 Venezuelan constitutional referendum, which had offered two packages of constitutional reforms aimed at deepening the Bolivarian Revolution.

Two major blocs of political parties are in Venezuela: the incumbent leftist bloc United Socialist Party of Venezuela (PSUV), its major allies Fatherland for All (PPT) and the Communist Party of Venezuela (PCV), and the opposition bloc grouped into the electoral coalition Mesa de la Unidad Democrática. This includes A New Era (UNT) together with allied parties Project Venezuela, Justice First, Movement for Socialism (MAS) and others. Hugo Chávez, the central figure of the Venezuelan political landscape since his election to the presidency in 1998 as a political outsider, died in office in early 2013, and was succeeded by Nicolás Maduro (initially as interim president, before narrowly winning the 2013 Venezuelan presidential election).

The Venezuelan president is elected by a vote, with direct and universal suffrage, and is both head of state and head of government. The term of office is six years, and (as of 15 February 2009) a president may be re-elected an unlimited number of times. The president appoints the vice president and decides the size and composition of the cabinet and makes appointments to it with the involvement of the legislature. The president can ask the legislature to reconsider portions of laws he finds objectionable, but a simple parliamentary majority can override these objections.

The president may ask the National Assembly to pass an enabling act granting the ability to rule by decree in specified policy areas; this requires a two-thirds majority in the Assembly. Since 1959, six Venezuelan presidents have been granted such powers.

The unicameral Venezuelan parliament is the Asamblea Nacional ("National Assembly"). The number of members is variable – each state and the Capital district elect three representatives plus the result of dividing the state population by 1.1% of the total population of the country. Three seats are reserved for representatives of Venezuela's indigenous peoples. For the 2011–2016 period the number of seats is 165. All deputies serve five-year terms.

The voting age in Venezuela is 18 and older. Voting is not compulsory.

The legal system of Venezuela belongs to the Continental Law tradition. The highest judicial body is the Supreme Tribunal of Justice or Tribunal Supremo de Justicia, whose magistrates are elected by parliament for a single two-year term. The National Electoral Council (Consejo Nacional Electoral, or CNE) is in charge of electoral processes; it is formed by five main directors elected by the National Assembly. Supreme Court president Luisa Estela Morales said in December 2009 that Venezuela had moved away from "a rigid division of powers" toward a system characterized by "intense coordination" between the branches of government. Morales clarified that each power must be independent adding that "one thing is separation of powers and another one is division".

Suspension of constitutional rights 

The 2015 parliamentary elections were held on 6 December 2015 to elect the 164 deputies and three indigenous representatives of the National Assembly. In 2014, a series of protest and demonstrations began in Venezuela, attributed to inflation, violence and shortages in Venezuela. The protests were largely peaceful.
The government has accused the protest of being motivated by fascists, opposition leaders, capitalism and foreign influence, 
President Maduro acknowledged PSUV defeat, but attributed the opposition's victory to an intensification of an economic war. Despite this, Maduro said "I will stop by hook or by crook the opposition coming to power, whatever the costs, in any way". In the following months, Maduro fulfilled his promise of preventing the democratically and constitutionally elected National Assembly from legislating. The first steps taken by PSUV and government were the substitution of the entire Supreme court a day after the Parliamentary Elections contrary to the Constitution of Venezuela, acclaimed as a fraud by the majority of the Venezuelan and international press. The Financial Times described the function of the Supreme Court in Venezuela as "rubber stamping executive whims and vetoing legislation". The PSUV government used this violation to suspend several elected opponents, ignoring again the Constitution of Venezuela. Maduro said that "the Amnesty law (approved by the Parliament) will not be executed" and asked the Supreme Court to declare it unconstitutional before the law was known.

On 16 January 2016, Maduro approved an unconstitutional economic emergency decree, relegating to his own figure the legislative and executive powers, while also holding judiciary power through the fraudulent designation of judges the day after the election on 6 December 2015. From these events, Maduro effectively controls all three branches of government. On 14 May 2016, constitutional guarantees were in fact suspended when Maduro decreed the extension of the economic emergency decree for another 60 days and declared a State of Emergency, which is a clear violation of the Constitution of Venezuela in the Article 338th: "The approval of the extension of States of emergency corresponds to the National Assembly." Thus, constitutional rights in Venezuela are considered suspended in fact by many publications and public figures.

On 14 May 2016, the Organization of American States was considering the application of the Inter-American Democratic Charter sanctions for non-compliance to its own constitution.

In March 2017, the Venezuelan Supreme Court took over law making powers from the National Assembly but reversed its decision the following day.

Foreign relations 

Throughout most of the 20th century, Venezuela maintained friendly relations with most Latin American and Western nations. Relations between Venezuela and the United States government worsened in 2002, after the 2002 Venezuelan coup d'état attempt during which the U.S. government recognized the short-lived interim presidency of Pedro Carmona. In 2015, Venezuela was declared a national security threat by U.S. president Barack Obama. Correspondingly, ties to various Latin American and Middle Eastern countries not allied to the U.S. have strengthened. For example, according to Matt Wilgress in the Morning Star, Palestinian foreign minister Riyad al-Maliki declared in 2015 that Venezuela was his country's "most important ally".

Venezuela seeks alternative hemispheric integration via such proposals as the Bolivarian Alternative for the Americas trade proposal and the newly launched Latin American television network teleSUR. Venezuela is one of five nations in the world—along with Russia, Nicaragua, Nauru, and Syria—to have recognized the independence of Abkhazia and South Ossetia. Venezuela was a proponent of OAS's decision to adopt its Anti-Corruption Convention and is actively working in the Mercosur trade bloc to push increased trade and energy integration. Globally, it seeks a "multi-polar" world based on strengthened ties among undeveloped countries.

On 26 April 2017, Venezuela announced its intention to withdraw from the OAS. Venezuelan Foreign Minister Delcy Rodríguez said that President Nicolás Maduro plans to publicly renounce Venezuela's membership on 27 April 2017. It will take two years for the country to formally leave. During this period, the country does not plan on participating in the OAS.

Venezuela is involved in a long-standing disagreement about the control of the Guayana Esequiba area.

Venezuela may suffer a deterioration of its power in international affairs if the global transition to renewable energy is completed. It is ranked 151 out of 156 countries in the index of Geopolitical Gains and Losses after energy transition (GeGaLo).

 Military 

The Bolivarian National Armed Forces of the Bolivarian Republic of Venezuela (Fuerza Armada Nacional Bolivariana, FANB) are the overall unified military forces of Venezuela. It includes over 320,150 men and women, under Article 328 of the Constitution, in 5 components of Ground, Sea and Air. The components of the Bolivarian National Armed Forces are: the Venezuelan Army, the Venezuelan Navy, the Venezuelan Air Force, the Venezuelan National Guard, and the Venezuelan National Militia.

, a further 600,000 soldiers were incorporated into a new branch, known as the Armed Reserve. The president of Venezuela is the commander-in-chief of the national armed forces. The main roles of the armed forces are to defend the sovereign national territory of Venezuela, airspace, and islands, fight against drug trafficking, to search and rescue and, in the case of a natural disaster, civil protection. All male citizens of Venezuela have a constitutional duty to register for the military service at the age of 18, which is the age of majority in Venezuela.

 Law and crime 

In Venezuela, a person is murdered every 21 minutes. Violent crimes have been so prevalent in Venezuela that the government no longer produces the crime data. In 2013, the homicide rate was approximately 79 per 100,000, one of the world's highest, having quadrupled in the past 15 years with over 200,000 people murdered. By 2015, it had risen to 90 per 100,000. The country's body count of the previous decade mimics that of the Iraq War and in some instances had more civilian deaths even though the country is at peacetime. The capital Caracas has one of the greatest homicide rates of any large city in the world, with 122 homicides per 100,000 residents. In 2008, polls indicated that crime was the number one concern of voters. Attempts at fighting crime such as Operation Liberation of the People were implemented to crack down on gang-controlled areas but, of reported criminal acts, less than 2% are prosecuted. In 2017, the Financial Times noted that some of the arms procured by the government over the previous two decades had been diverted to paramilitary civilian groups and criminal syndicates.

Venezuela is especially dangerous for foreign travelers and investors who are visiting. The United States Department of State and the Government of Canada have warned foreign visitors that they may be subjected to robbery, kidnapping for a ransom or sale to terrorist organizations and murder, and that their own diplomatic travelers are required to travel in armored vehicles. The United Kingdom's Foreign and Commonwealth Office has advised against all travel to Venezuela. Visitors have been murdered during robberies and criminals do not discriminate among their victims. Former Miss Venezuela 2004 winner Mónica Spear and her ex-husband were murdered and their 5-year-old daughter was shot while vacationing in Venezuela, and an elderly German tourist was murdered only a few weeks later.

There are approximately 33 prisons holding about 50,000 inmates. They include; El Rodeo outside of Caracas, Yare Prison in the northern state of Miranda, and several others. Venezuela's prison system is heavily overcrowded; its facilities have capacity for only 14,000 prisoners.

Human rights

Human rights organizations such as Human Rights Watch and Amnesty International have increasingly criticized Venezuela's human rights record, with the former organization noting in 2017 that the Chavez and subsequently the Maduro government have increasingly concentrated power in the executive branch, eroded constitutional human rights protections and allowed the government to persecute and repress its critics and opposition. Other persistent concerns as noted by the report included poor prison conditions, the continuous harassment of independent media and human rights defenders by the government. In 2006, the Economist Intelligence Unit rated Venezuela a "hybrid regime" and the third least democratic regime in Latin America on the Democracy Index. The Democracy index downgraded Venezuela to an authoritarian regime in 2017, citing continued increasingly dictatorial behaviors by the Maduro government.

Corruption

Corruption in Venezuela is high by world standards and was so for much of the 20th century. The discovery of oil worsened political corruption, and by the late 1970s, Juan Pablo Pérez Alfonso's description of oil as "the Devil's excrement" had become a common expression in Venezuela. Venezuela has been ranked one of the most corrupt countries on the Corruption Perceptions Index since the survey started in 1995. The 2010 ranking placed Venezuela at number 164, out of 178 ranked countries in government transparency. By 2016, the rank had increased to 166 out of 178. Similarly, the World Justice Project ranked Venezuela 99th out of 99 countries surveyed in its 2014 Rule of Law Index.

This corruption is shown with Venezuela's significant involvement in drug trafficking, with Colombian cocaine and other drugs transiting Venezuela towards the United States and Europe. In the period 2003–2008 Venezuelan authorities seized the fifth-largest total quantity of cocaine in the world, behind Colombia, the United States, Spain and Panama. In 2006, the government's agency for combating illegal drug trade in Venezuela, ONA, was incorporated into the office of the vice-president of the country. However, many major government and military officials have been known for their involvement with drug trafficking; especially with the October 2013 incident of men from the Venezuelan National Guard placing 1.3 tons of cocaine on a Paris flight knowing they would not face charges.

 Administrative divisions 

Venezuela is divided into 23 states (estados), a capital district (distrito capital) corresponding to the city of Caracas, and the Federal Dependencies (Dependencias Federales, a special territory). Venezuela is further subdivided into 335 municipalities (municipios); these are subdivided into over one thousand parishes (parroquias). The states are grouped into nine administrative regions (regiones administrativas), which were established in 1969 by presidential decree.

The country can be further divided into ten geographical areas, some corresponding to climatic and biogeographical regions. In the north are the Venezuelan Andes and the Coro region, a mountainous tract in the northwest, holds several sierras and valleys. East of it are lowlands abutting Lake Maracaibo and the Gulf of Venezuela.

The Central Range runs parallel to the coast and includes the hills surrounding Caracas; the Eastern Range, separated from the Central Range by the Gulf of Cariaco, covers all of Sucre and northern Monagas. The Insular Region includes all of Venezuela's island possessions: Nueva Esparta and the various Federal Dependencies. The Orinoco Delta, which forms a triangle covering Delta Amacuro, projects northeast into the Atlantic Ocean.

Additionally, the country maintains a historical claim on the territory it calls Guyana Esequiba, which is equivalent to about 160,000 square kilometers and corresponds to all the territory administered by Guyana west of the Esequibo River. 
In 1966 the British and Venezuelan governments signed the Geneva Agreement to resolve the conflict peacefully. In addition to this agreement, the Port of Spain Protocol of 1970 set a deadline to try to resolve the issue, without success to date.

 Largest cities 

 Economy 

Venezuela has a market-based mixed economy dominated by the petroleum sector, which accounts for roughly a third of GDP, around 80% of exports, and more than half of government revenues. Per capita GDP for 2016 was estimated to be US$15,100, ranking 109th in the world. Venezuela has the least expensive petrol in the world because the consumer price of petrol is heavily subsidized. The private sector controls two-thirds of Venezuela's economy.

A part of the Venezuelan economy depends on remittances.

The Central Bank of Venezuela is responsible for developing monetary policy for the Venezuelan bolívar which is used as currency. The president of the Central Bank of Venezuela serves as the country's representative in the International Monetary Fund.  The U.S.-based conservative think tank The Heritage Foundation, cited in The Wall Street Journal, claims Venezuela has the weakest property rights in the world, scoring only 5.0 on a scale of 100; expropriation without compensation is not uncommon.

As of 2011, more than 60% of Venezuela's international reserves was in gold, eight times more than the average for the region. Most of Venezuela's gold held abroad was located in London. On 25 November 2011, the first of US$11 billion of repatriated gold bullion arrived in Caracas; Chávez called the repatriation of gold a "sovereign" step that will help protect the country's foreign reserves from the turmoil in the U.S. and Europe. However government policies quickly spent down this returned gold and in 2013 the government was forced to add the dollar reserves of state owned companies to those of the national bank to reassure the international bond market.

Manufacturing contributed 17% of GDP in 2006. Venezuela manufactures and exports heavy industry products such as steel, aluminium and cement, with production concentrated around Ciudad Guayana, near the Guri Dam, one of the largest in the world and the provider of about three-quarters of Venezuela's electricity. Other notable manufacturing includes electronics and automobiles, as well as beverages, and foodstuffs. Agriculture in Venezuela accounts for approximately 3% of GDP, 10% of the labor force, and at least a quarter of Venezuela's land area. The country is not self-sufficient in most areas of agriculture. In 2012, total food consumption was over 26 million metric tonnes, a 94.8% increase from 2003.

Since the discovery of oil in the early 20th century, Venezuela has been one of the world's leading exporters of oil, and it is a founding member of OPEC. Previously an underdeveloped exporter of agricultural commodities such as coffee and cocoa, oil quickly came to dominate exports and government revenues. The 1980s oil glut led to an external debt crisis and a long-running economic crisis, which saw inflation peak at 100% in 1996. As (by 1998) per capita GDP fell to the same level as 1963, down a third from its 1978 peak. The 1990s also saw Venezuela experience a major banking crisis in 1994.

The recovery of oil prices after 2001 boosted the Venezuelan economy and facilitated social spending. With social programs such as the Bolivarian Missions, Venezuela initially made progress in social development in the 2000s, particularly in areas such as health, education, and poverty. Many of the social policies pursued by Chávez and his administration were jump-started by the Millennium Development Goals, eight goals that Venezuela and 188 other nations agreed to in September 2000. The sustainability of the Bolivarian Missions has been questioned due to the Bolivarian state's overspending on public works and because the Chávez government did not save funds for future economic hardships like other OPEC nations; with economic issues and poverty rising as a result of their policies in the 2010s. In 2003 the government of Hugo Chávez implemented currency controls after capital flight led to a devaluation of the currency. This led to the development of a parallel market of dollars in the subsequent years. The fallout of the 2008 global financial crisis saw a renewed economic downturn. Despite controversial data shared by the Venezuelan government showing that the country had halved malnutrition following one of the UN's Millennium Development Goals, shortages of staple goods began to occur in Venezuela and malnutrition began to increase.

In early 2013, Venezuela devalued its currency due to growing shortages in the country. The shortages included, and still include, necessities such as toilet paper, milk, and flour. Fears rose so high due to the toilet paper shortage that the government occupied a toilet paper factory, and continued further plans to nationalize other industrial aspects like food distribution. Venezuela's bond ratings have also decreased multiple times in 2013 due to decisions by the president Nicolás Maduro. One of his decisions was to force stores and their warehouses to sell all of their products, which led to even more shortages in the future. In 2016, consumer prices in Venezuela increased 800% and the economy declined by 18.6%, entering an economic depression. Venezuela's outlook was deemed negative by most bond-rating services in 2017. For 2018 an inflation rate of 1,000,000 percent was projected, putting Venezuela in a similar situation to that in Germany in 1923 or Zimbabwe in the late 2000s.

Tourism

Tourism has been developed considerably in recent decades, particularly because of its favorable geographical position, the variety of landscapes, the richness of plant and wildlife, the artistic expressions and the privileged tropical climate of the country, which affords each region (especially the beaches) throughout the year.

Margarita Island is one of the top tourist destinations for enjoyment and relaxation. It is an island with a modern infrastructure, bordered by beautiful beaches suitable for extreme sports, and features castles, fortresses and churches of great cultural value.

Los Roques Archipelago is made up of a set of islands and keys that constitute one of the main tourist attractions in the country. With exotic crystalline beaches, Morrocoy is a national park, formed by small keys very close to the mainland, which have grown rapidly as one of the greatest tourist attractions in the Venezuelan Caribbean.

Canaima National Park extends over 30,000 km2 to the border with Guyana and Brazil, due to its size it is considered the sixth largest national park in the world. About 65% of the park is occupied by rock plateaus called tepuis. These constitute a unique biological environment, also presenting great geological interest. Its steep cliffs and waterfalls (including Angel Falls, which is the highest waterfall in the world, at 1,002 m) form spectacular landscapes.

The state of Mérida, for the beauty of its Andean landscapes and its pleasant climate, is one of the main tourist centers of Venezuela. It has an extensive network of hotels not only in its capital city, but also throughout the state. Starting from the same city of Mérida, is the longest and highest cable car in the world, which reaches the Pico Espejo of 4,765 m. It is also necessary to recommend to travel through magnificent roads, the southern moors, where you can find good hotels and restaurants.

 Shortages 

Shortages in Venezuela have been prevalent following the enactment of price controls and other policies during the economic policy of the Hugo Chávez government. Under the economic policy of the Nicolás Maduro government, greater shortages occurred due to the Venezuelan government's policy of withholding United States dollars from importers with price controls.Shortages occur in regulated products, such as milk, various types of meat, coffee, rice, oil, flour, butter, and other goods including basic necessities like toilet paper, personal hygiene products, and even medicine. As a result of the shortages, Venezuelans must search for food, wait in lines for hours and sometimes settle without having certain products. Maduro's government has blamed the shortages on "bourgeois criminals" hoarding goods.

A drought, combined with a lack of planning and maintenance, has caused a hydroelectricity shortage.  To deal with lack of power supply, in April 2016 the Maduro government announced rolling blackouts and reduced the government workweek to only Monday and Tuesday. A multi-university study found that, in 2016 alone, about 75% of Venezuelans lost weight due to hunger, with the average losing about 8.6 kg (19 lbs) due to the lack of food.

By late-2016 and into 2017, Venezuelans had to search for food on a daily basis, occasionally resorting to eating wild fruit or garbage, wait in lines for hours and sometimes settle without having certain products. By early 2017, priests began telling Venezuelans to label their garbage so needy individuals could feed on their refuse. In March 2017, Venezuela, with the largest oil reserves in the world, began having shortages of gasoline in some regions with reports that fuel imports had begun.

 Petroleum and other resources 

Venezuela has the largest oil reserves, and the eighth largest natural gas reserves in the world. Compared to the preceding year another 40.4% in crude oil reserves were proven in 2010, allowing Venezuela to surpass Saudi Arabia as the country with the largest reserves of this type. The country's main petroleum deposits are located around and beneath Lake Maracaibo, the Gulf of Venezuela (both in Zulia), and in the Orinoco River basin (eastern Venezuela), where the country's largest reserve is located. Besides the largest conventional oil reserves and the second-largest natural gas reserves in the Western Hemisphere, Venezuela has non-conventional oil deposits (extra-heavy crude oil, bitumen and tar sands) approximately equal to the world's reserves of conventional oil. The electricity sector in Venezuela is one of the few to rely primarily on hydropower, and includes the Guri Dam, one of the largest in the world.

In the first half of the 20th century, U.S. oil companies were heavily involved in Venezuela, initially interested only in purchasing concessions. In 1943 a new government introduced a 50/50 split in profits between the government and the oil industry. In 1960, with a newly installed democratic government, Hydrocarbons Minister Juan Pablo Pérez Alfonso led the creation of OPEC, the consortium of oil-producing countries aiming to support the price of oil.

In 1973, Venezuela voted to nationalize its oil industry outright, effective 1 January 1976, with Petróleos de Venezuela (PDVSA) taking over and presiding over a number of holding companies; in subsequent years, Venezuela built a vast refining and marketing system in the U.S. and Europe. In the 1990s PDVSA became more independent from the government and presided over an apertura (opening) in which it invited in foreign investment. Under Hugo Chávez a 2001 law placed limits on foreign investment.

The state oil company PDVSA played a key role in the December 2002 – February 2003 national strike which sought President Chávez' resignation. Managers and skilled highly paid technicians of PDVSA shut down the plants joined the strike, and petroleum production and refining by PDVSA almost ceased. Activities eventually were slowly restarted by returning and substitute oil workers. As a result of the strike, around 40% of the company's workforce (around 18,000 workers) were dismissed.

 Transport 

Venezuela is connected to the world primarily via air (Venezuela's airports include the Simón Bolívar International Airport in Maiquetía, near Caracas and La Chinita International Airport near Maracaibo) and sea (with major sea ports at La Guaira, Maracaibo and Puerto Cabello). In the south and east the Amazon rainforest region has limited cross-border transport; in the west, there is a mountainous border of over  shared with Colombia.

Venezuela has a limited national railway system, which has no active rail connections to other countries. The government of Hugo Chávez tried to invest in expanding it, but Venezuela's rail project is on hold due to Venezuela not being able to pay the $7.5 billion and owing China Railway nearly $500 million.
Several major cities have metro systems; the Caracas Metro has been operating since 1983. The Maracaibo Metro and Valencia Metro were opened more recently.

 Demographics 

Venezuela is among the most urbanized countries in Latin America; the vast majority of Venezuelans live in the cities of the north, especially in the capital Caracas, which is also the largest city. Though almost half of Venezuela's land area lies south of the Orinoco, only 5% of Venezuelans live there. The largest and most important city south of the Orinoco is Ciudad Guayana, which is the sixth most populous conurbation. Other major cities include Barquisimeto, Valencia, Maracay, Maracaibo, Barcelona-Puerto La Cruz, Mérida and San Cristóbal.

According to a 2014 study by sociologists of the Central University of Venezuela, over 1.5 million Venezuelans, or about 4% to 6% of the country's population, have left Venezuela since 1999 following the Bolivarian Revolution.

 Ethnicity 

The people of Venezuela come from a variety of ancestries. It is estimated that the majority of the population is of pardo, or mixed, ethnic ancestry. Nevertheless, in the 2011 census, which Venezuelans were asked to identify themselves according to their customs and ancestry, the term pardo was excluded from the answers. The majority claimed to be moreno or white—51.6% and 43.6%, respectively. Practically half of the population claimed to be moreno, a term used throughout Ibero-America that in this case means "dark-skinned" or "brown-skinned", as opposed to having a lighter skin (this term connotes skin color or tone, rather than facial features or descent).

Ethnic minorities in Venezuela consist of groups that descend mainly from African or indigenous peoples; 2.8% identified themselves as "black" and 0.7% as afrodescendiente (Afro-descendant), 2.6% claimed to belong to indigenous peoples, and 1.2% answered "other races".

Among indigenous people, 58% were Wayúu, 7% Warao, 5% Kariña, 4% Pemón, 3% Piaroa, 3% Jivi, 3% Añu, 3% Cumanágoto, 2% Yukpa, 2% Chaima and 1% Yanomami; the remaining 9% consisted of other indigenous nations.

According to an autosomal DNA genetic study conducted in 2008 by the University of Brasília (UNB), the composition of Venezuela's population is 60.60% of European contribution, 23% of indigenous contribution, and 16.30% of African contribution.

During the colonial period and until after the Second World War, many of the European immigrants to Venezuela came from the Canary Islands and Spain with a relevant amount of Galicians and Asturians. These immigrants from Spain had a significant cultural impact on the cuisine and customs of Venezuela. These influences on Venezuela have led to the nation being called the 8th island of the Canaries. With the start of oil exploitation in the early 20th century, companies from the United States began establishing operations in Venezuela, bringing with them U.S. citizens. Later, during and after the war, new waves of immigrants from other parts of Europe, the Middle East, and China began; many were encouraged by government-established immigration programs and lenient immigration policies. During the 20th century, Venezuela, along with the rest of Latin America, received millions of immigrants from Europe. This was especially true post-World War II, as a consequence of war-ridden Europe. During the 1970s, while experiencing an oil-export boom, Venezuela received millions of immigrants from Ecuador, Colombia, and the Dominican Republic. Due to the belief that this immigration influx depressed wages, some Venezuelans opposed European immigration. The Venezuelan government, however, were actively recruiting immigrants from Eastern Europe to fill a need for engineers. Millions of Colombians, as well as Middle Eastern and Haitian populations would continue immigrating to Venezuela into the early 21st century.

According to the World Refugee Survey 2008, published by the U.S. Committee for Refugees and Immigrants, Venezuela hosted a population of refugee and asylum seekers from Colombia numbering 252,200 in 2007, and 10,600 new asylum seekers entered Venezuela in 2007. Between 500,000 and one million illegal immigrants are estimated to be living in the country.

The total indigenous population of the country is estimated at 500 thousand people (2.8% of the total), distributed among 40 indigenous peoples. There are three uncontacted tribes living in Venezuela. The Constitution recognizes the multi-ethnic, pluri-cultural, and multilingual character of the country and includes a chapter devoted to indigenous peoples' rights, which opened up spaces for their political inclusion at national and local level in 1999.
Most indigenous peoples are concentrated in eight states along Venezuela's borders with Brazil, Guyana, and Colombia, and the majority groups are the Wayuu in the west, the Warao in the east, the Yanomami installed in the south, and the Pemon which are mostly in the southeast of Venezuela.

 Languages 

Although most residents are monolingual Spanish speakers, many languages are spoken in Venezuela. In addition to Spanish, the Constitution recognizes more than thirty indigenous languages, including Wayuu, Warao, Pemón, and many others for the official use of the indigenous peoples, mostly with few speakers – less than 1% of the total population. Wayuu is the most spoken indigenous language, with 170,000 speakers.

Immigrants, in addition to Spanish, speak their own languages. Chinese (400,000), Portuguese (254,000), and Italian (200,000) are the most-spoken languages in Venezuela after the official language of Spanish. Arabic is spoken by Lebanese and Syrian colonies on Isla de Margarita, Maracaibo, Punto Fijo, Puerto la Cruz, El Tigre, Maracay, and Caracas. Portuguese is spoken not only by the Portuguese community in Santa Elena de Uairén but also by much of the population due to its proximity to Brazil. The German community speaks their native language, while the people of Colonia Tovar speak mostly an Alemannic dialect of German called alemán coloniero.

English is the most widely used foreign language in demand and is spoken by many professionals, academics, and members of the upper and middle classes as a result of the oil exploration by foreign companies, in addition to its acceptance as a lingua franca. Culturally, English is common in southern towns like El Callao, and the native English-speaking influence is evident in folk and calypso songs from the region. English was brought to Venezuela by Trinidadian and other British West Indies immigrants. A variety of Antillean Creole is spoken by a small community in El Callao and Paria. Italian language teaching is guaranteed by the presence of a consistent number of private Venezuelan schools and institutions, where Italian language courses and Italian literature are active. Other languages spoken by large communities in the country are Basque and Galician, among others.

 Religion 

According to a 2011 poll (GIS XXI), 88% of the population is Christian, primarily Roman Catholic (71%), and the remaining 17% Protestant, primarily Evangelicals (in Latin America Protestants are usually called "evangélicos"). 8% of Venezuelans are irreligious (atheist 2% and agnostic and 6% indifferent). Almost 3% of the population follow another religion (1% of these people practice Santería).

There are small but influential Muslim, Druze, Buddhist, and Jewish communities. The Muslim community of more than 100,000 is concentrated among persons of Lebanese and Syrian descent living in Nueva Esparta state, Punto Fijo and the Caracas area. Venezuela is home of the largest Druze communities outside the Middle East, the Druze community are estimated around 60,000, and concentrated among persons of Lebanese and Syrian descent (a former vice president is Druze, showing the small group's influence). Buddhism in Venezuela is practiced by over 52,000 people. The Buddhist community is made up mainly of Chinese, Japanese, and Korean people. There are Buddhist centers in Caracas, Maracay, Mérida, Puerto Ordáz, San Felipe, and Valencia.

The Jewish community has shrunk in recent years due to rising economic pressures and antisemitism in Venezuela,Annual Report 2004: Venezuela.  Stephen Roth Institute. Accessed 11 August 2006.Report: Anti-Semitism on Rise in Venezuela; Chavez Government 'Fosters Hate' Toward Jews and Israel.  Press release, Anti-Defamation League, 6 November 2006. Accessed 3 April 2008. with the population declining from 22,000 in 1999 to less than 7,000 in 2015.

 Health 

Venezuela has a national universal health care system. The current government has created a program to expand access to health care known as Misión Barrio Adentro, although its efficiency and work conditions have been criticized. It has been reported that many Misión Barrio Adentro clinics have been closed, and (as of December 2014) it is estimated that 80% of Barrio Adentro establishments in Venezuela are abandoned.

Infant mortality in Venezuela was 19 deaths per 1,000 births for 2014 which was lower than the South American average (To compare: The U.S. figure was 6 deaths per 1,000 births in 2013 and the Canadian figure was 4.5 deaths per 1,000 live births). Child malnutrition (defined as stunting or wasting in children under the age of five) was 17%. Delta Amacuro and Amazonas had the nation's highest rates. According to the United Nations, 32% of Venezuelans lacked adequate sanitation, primarily those living in rural areas. Diseases ranging from diphtheria, plague, malaria, typhoid fever, yellow fever, cholera, hepatitis A, hepatitis B, and hepatitis D were present in the country. Obesity was prevalent in approximately 30% of the adult population in Venezuela.

Venezuela had a total of 150 sewage treatment plants; however, 13% of the population lacked access to drinking water, but this number had been dropping.

During the economic crisis observed under President Maduro's presidency, medical professionals were forced to perform outdated treatments on patients.

 Education 

The literacy rate of the adult population was already at 91.1% by 1998. In 2008, 95.2% of the adult population was literate. The net primary school enrollment rate was at 91% and the net secondary school enrollment rate was at 63% in 2005. Venezuela has a number of universities, of which the most prestigious are the Central University of Venezuela (UCV) founded in Caracas in 1721, the University of Zulia (LUZ) founded in 1891, the University of the Andes (ULA) founded in Mérida State in 1810, the Simón Bolívar University (USB) founded in Miranda State in 1967, and the University of the East (UDO) founded in Sucre State in 1958.

Currently, many Venezuelan graduates seek a future abroad because of the country's troubled economy and heavy crime rate. In a study titled "Venezolana Community Abroad: A New Method of Exile" by Thomas Páez, Mercedes Vivas, and Juan Rafael Pulido of the Central University of Venezuela, over 1.35 million Venezuelan college graduates have left the country since the beginning of the Bolivarian Revolution. It is believed that nearly 12% of Venezuelans live abroad, with Ireland becoming a popular destination for students. According to Claudio Bifano, president of the Venezuelan Academy of Physical, Mathematical, and Natural Sciences, more than half of all medical graduates had left Venezuela in 2013.

By 2018, over half of all Venezuelan children had dropped out of school, with 58% of students quitting nationwide while areas near bordering countries saw more than 80% of their students leave. Nationwide, about 93% of schools do not meet the minimum requirements to operate and 77% do not have utilities such as food, water or electricity.

 Culture 

The culture of Venezuela is a melting pot made up of three main groups: The Indigenous Venezuelans, the Africans, and the Spanish. The first two cultures were in turn differentiated according to their tribes. Acculturation and assimilation, typical of a cultural syncretism, led to the Venezuelan culture of the present day, which is similar in many ways to the culture of the rest of Latin America, but still has its own unique characteristics.

The indigenous and African influence is limited to a few words, food names, and place names. However, the Africans also brought in many musical influences, especially introduction of the drum. The Spanish influence predominantes due to the colonization process and the socioeconomic structure it created, and in particular came from the regions of Andalusia and Extremadura (the places of origin of most of the settlers in the Caribbean during the colonial era). Spanish influences can be seen in the country's architecture, music, religion, and language.

Spanish influences can also be seen in the bullfights that take place in Venezuela, and in certain gastronomical features. Venezuela was also enriched by immigration streams of Indian and European origin in the 19th century, especially from France. Most recently, immigration from the United States, Spain, Italy, and Portugal has further enriched the already complex cultural mosaic (especially in large oil-producing cities).

 Architecture 
Carlos Raúl Villanueva was the most important Venezuelan architect of the modern era; he designed the Central University of Venezuela, (a World Heritage Site) and its Aula Magna. Other notable architectural works include the Capitolio, the Baralt Theatre, the Teresa Carreño Cultural Complex, and the General Rafael Urdaneta Bridge.

In Venezuela, prehistoric man began to build useful architecture from approximately 1000 B.C. to the 15th century A.D., in the period known as the "Neo-Indian".

Neo-Indian architecture consisted of incipient constructions, such as agricultural terraces and vaults lined by stones, called mintoyes, which were used as tombs and silos for the storage of agricultural products.

In the western plains there is evidence of artificial constructions associated with agriculture, consisting of embankments, raised fields, camellones or causeways that functioned as water retaining walls in flooded areas and made it possible, among other things, to cross them on foot.

Six stations of megalithic assemblages composed of menhirs, or vertical rocks in a row, have also been recorded. In some of those that have been found there are detailed artistic representations of the Venezuelan indigenous people, with petroglyphic engravings.

The most worked material in this period was stone.

The Indo-Hispanic architecture is the one that begins to develop from the year 1498 A.D.,  year in which the colonizers arrive to Venezuelan coasts. In the 15th century, two types of architectures were projected, the one worked by the Venezuelan aborigines, and the one built by the Spaniards in Venezuelan territory.

The Venezuelan indigenous architecture was worked in two different spaces, the water and the jungle. To the water architecture, correspond the palafitos, which were common dwellings of the Wayúu and Warao tribes. They were small dwellings, supported on wooden stilts, built on the calm waters of lakes and lagoons. Historians say that when Amerigo Vespucci arrived on Venezuelan shores and observed the stilt houses on Lake Maracaibo, he called the place "Little Venice", from which the name Venezuela was derived some time later. Today, although the number of indigenous communities has decreased, those that still exist preserve the architecture of their ancestors in the territories of the eastern coast of Lake Maracaibo and in the Orinoco delta can still be found these palafittes.

Venezuelan colonial architecture is built from the 16th century, when Venezuela began to be a dependent colony of the Spanish Empire, until 1810, when the process of Venezuelan independence began.

The architecture of this period is characterized by its discreet modesty. The explanation lies in the socioeconomic conditions of the country. Venezuela did not offer then to the colonizers the immense riches kept by nature for later times.

An apparently not very rich province could not afford the luxury of constructing high-cost buildings in imitation of the great viceroyalties that existed at the time, and the colonial society did not offer a picture as prosperous as that of other Latin American countries.

The simplification of technical problems, the renunciation of most of the decorative elements and variegated ostentations of fanciful baroque, the impossibility of using expensive materials and the consequent lack of craftsmen, contributed to establish a modest but well-defined physiognomy of the colonial architecture of Venezuela.

During the colonial period, there were eventually confrontations between the Spanish conquerors and the barbarians that sailed along the Venezuelan coasts, in order to take over the provinces located on the coasts of the country. At that time, the kingdoms of Europe were facing an economic crisis, so English, Dutch, Portuguese and French armed crews arrived in Venezuela, with the purpose of appropriating the territories of the province and plundering the coastal cities.

The Venezuelan coasts and islands were the scene of combats produced by corsairs and pirates, so Spain was obliged to maintain its empire, building castles, bastions, barracks and fortifications that protected the cities of the province.

Christian temples from the colonial era were constituted by an almost invariable, arrangement consisting of a rectangular plan, three naves separated by arches of alfarje roofing composed of religious architecture in colonial times. The Venezuelan society dedicated a great amount of resources to erect religious monuments comparable to those of other countries of the continent. The XVII century was of reconstruction of the Catholic churches that had been destroyed by the earthquake of 1641. In the 18th century, specifically between 1728 and 1785, the prosperity that Venezuela enjoyed due to the opening of the Compañía Guipuzcoana was also reflected in the construction of new architecture, especially of a religious nature.

 Art 

Venezuelan art was initially dominated by religious motifs. However, in the late 19th century, artists began emphasizing historical and heroic representations of the country's struggle for independence. This move was led by Martín Tovar y Tovar. Modernism took over in the 20th century. Notable Venezuelan artists include Arturo Michelena, Cristóbal Rojas, Armando Reverón, Manuel Cabré; the kinetic artists Jesús Soto, Gego and Carlos Cruz-Diez; and contemporary artists such as Marisol and Yucef Merhi.

 Literature 

Venezuelan literature originated soon after the Spanish conquest of the mostly pre-literate indigenous societies. It was originally dominated by Spanish influences.  Following the rise of political literature during the Venezuelan War of Independence, Venezuelan Romanticism, notably expounded by Juan Vicente González, emerged as the first important genre in the region. Although mainly focused on narrative writing, Venezuelan literature was advanced by poets such as Andrés Eloy Blanco and Fermín Toro.

Major writers and novelists include Rómulo Gallegos, Teresa de la Parra, Arturo Uslar Pietri, Adriano González León, Miguel Otero Silva, and Mariano Picón Salas. The great poet and humanist Andrés Bello was also an educator and intellectual (He was also a childhood tutor and mentor of Simón Bolívar). Others, such as Laureano Vallenilla Lanz and José Gil Fortoul, contributed to Venezuelan Positivism.

 Music 

The indigenous musical styles of Venezuela are exemplified by groups like Un Sólo Pueblo and Serenata Guayanesa. The national musical instrument is the cuatro. Traditional musical styles and songs mainly emerged in and around the llanos region, including, "Alma llanera" (by Pedro Elías Gutiérrez and Rafael Bolívar Coronado), "Florentino y el diablo" (by Alberto Arvelo Torrealba), "Concierto en la llanura" by Juan Vicente Torrealba, and "Caballo viejo" (by Simón Díaz).

The Zulian gaita is also a very popular genre, generally performed during Christmas. The national dance is the joropo. Venezuela has always been a melting pot of cultures and this can be seen in the richness and variety of its musical styles and dances: calipso, bambuco, fulía, cantos de pilado de maíz, cantos de lavanderas, sebucán, and maremare. Teresa Carreño was a world-famous 19th century piano virtuoso. Recently, great classical music performances have come out of Venezuela. The Simón Bolívar Youth Orchestra, under the leadership of its principal conductor Gustavo Dudamel and José Antonio Abreu, has hosted a number of excellent concerts in many European concert halls, most notably at the 2007 London Proms, and has received several honors. The orchestra is the pinnacle of El Sistema, a publicly financed, voluntary music education program now being emulated in other countries.

In the early 21st century, a movement known as "Movida Acústica Urbana" featured musicians trying to save some national traditions, creating their own original songs but using traditional instruments. Some groups following this movement are Tambor Urbano, Los Sinverguenzas, C4Trío, and Orozco Jam.

Afro-Venezuelan musical traditions are most intimately related to the festivals of the "black folk saints" San Juan and St. Benedict the Moor. Specific songs are related to the different stages of their festivals and processions, when the saints start their yearly "paseo" – stroll – through the community to dance with their people.

 Sport 

The origins of baseball in Venezuela are unclear, although it is known that the sport was being played in the country by the late 19th century. In the early 20th century, North American immigrants who came to Venezuela to work in the nation's oil industry helped to popularize the sport in Venezuela. During the 1930s, baseball's popularity continued to rise in the country, leading to the foundation of the Venezuelan Professional Baseball League (LVBP) in 1945, and the sport would soon become the nation's most popular.

The immense popularity of baseball in the country makes Venezuela a rarity among its South American neighbors—association football is the dominant sport in the continent. However, football, as well as basketball, are among the more popular sports played in Venezuela. Venezuela hosted the 2012 Basketball World Olympic Qualifying Tournament and the 2013 FIBA Basketball Americas Championship, which took place in the Poliedro de Caracas.

Although not as popular in Venezuela as the rest of South America, football, spearheaded by the Venezuela national football team is gaining popularity as well. The sport is also noted for having an increased focus during the World Cup. According to the CONMEBOL alphabetical rotation policy established in 2011, Venezuela is scheduled to host the Copa América every 40 years.

Venezuela is also home to former Formula 1 driver, Pastor Maldonado. At the 2012 Spanish Grand Prix, he claimed his first pole and victory, and became the first and only Venezuelan to have done so in Formula 1 history. Maldonado has increased the reception of Formula 1 in Venezuela, helping to popularize the sport in the country.

In the 2012 Summer Olympics, Venezuelan Rubén Limardo won a gold medal in fencing.

In the Winter Sports, Cesar Baena had represented the country since 2008 in Nordic Skiing, making history in the continent when been the first South American skier ever compete in a FIS Cross Country Ski World Cup on Düsseldorf 2009.

 Cuisine 

 See also 

 Index of Venezuela-related articles
 Outline of Venezuela
 Crime in Venezuela
 Operation Gideon (2020)

 References 

 Bibliography 

Articles

Books

 Carroll, Rory. Comandante: Hugo Chávez's Venezuela (Penguin Books, 2014).

 Schincariol, Vitor Eduardo. Society and Economy in Venezuela: An Overview of the Bolivarian Period (1998-2018). (2020).

 Straka, Tomás, Guillermo Guzmán Mirabal, and Alejandro E. Cáceres. Historical Dictionary of Venezuela (Rowman & Littlefield, 2017).

 Wilpert, Gregory. Changing Venezuela by taking power: the history and policies of the Chavez government (2007) online

Talks and interviews

 External links 

 Official Government Website  
 Chief of State and Cabinet Members 
 Venezuela. The World Factbook. Central Intelligence Agency. 
 Venezuela at UCB Libraries GovPubs'' 
  
 Venezuela from the Library of Congress Country Studies (1990) 
 Venezuela profile from the BBC News 
   
 Maps on Venezuela – Cartographic features 
 Key Development Forecasts for Venezuela from International Futures 
 Venezuela and Tourism from immigrationtovenezuela.com.ve 
 

 
Countries in South America
Federal constitutional republics
Former Spanish colonies
G15 nations
Member states of OPEC
Member states of the United Nations
Member states of the Union of South American Nations
Spanish-speaking countries and territories
States and territories established in 1811
Transcontinental countries